The Comet is a wooden roller coaster located at  Six Flags Great Escape and Hurricane Harbor in Queensbury, New York, in the United States.

Built from parts of the Crystal Beach Cyclone in 1948 at Crystal Beach, The Comet was resurrected and reopened by the Great Escape in 1994. Often rated one of the top roller coasters in the world in the 1990s, The Comet features a 2-minute ride over several hills. For the 2017 season, The Comet celebrated its 70th Anniversary.

History
The coaster started its existence at Crystal Beach Park (an amusement park in Fort Erie, Ontario) as a ride known as Cyclone in 1927. Cyclone was known as a fearsome coaster. Its metal support structure was torn down and rebuilt as The Comet in 1947. The ride was saved shortly after the park closed down forever after the 1989 season. Charlie Wood, the owner of The Great Escape in Queensbury, New York successfully bid for The Comet and it sat in storage for a few years in Fantasy Island before making its way to the park in Queensbury where it began service again. The ride was constructed by Martin & Vleminckx at Great Escape.

Ride experience

The roller coaster operates two trains, one red and one blue, each one capable of carrying twenty four riders in four cars in three rows, two across.

Owing to its location at the back of the park and simple queue maze, wait time for The Comet is usually under ten minutes; wait time generally only exceeds this if the queue line overflows the maze. If both trains are running on days of low attendance it is possible to move through the queue line in less than five minutes. Park regulars know that heading directly to the back of the park when the main gates open can assure guests of three or four uninterrupted rides before the queue line grows appreciably. Often early in the day and late at night park guests can reride without having to move from their seat. 

Riders generally describe The Comet as fast and smooth, with little chatter or shaking during the run. This can be attributed to its special design, for although the ride is billed as a wooden roller coaster, it is technically a hybrid coaster: it has a steel framework on which is placed wooden bed, on top of the wooden bed are the steel rails the coaster wheels run on. Turns are tight and only very slightly banked. On-ride photos are taken by a camera mounted on a dip closest to the control booth.

Theming
While using the historical name of The Comet, little is done to take advantage of the name with theming or decoration. On ride photos can be purchased with flames superimposed over the train to give the artificial appearance of actually riding a comet. Signage in the park directing guests to The Comet are similarly themed, along with the large lighted sign on the coaster structure itself.

A sign in the loading area gives most of the history of The Comet, and notes that the sheltered area for the queue line uses much of the original metal latticework from the old Cyclone.

ACE Coaster Landmark

On September 8, 2009, American Coaster Enthusiasts named The Comet a Coaster Landmark.

Awards

References

External links

 The Sights and Sounds of The Comet & Crystal Beach from Steve Cichon's staffannouncer.com
 A Review of The Comet

Roller coasters manufactured by Philadelphia Toboggan Coasters
Queensbury, New York
Roller coasters introduced in 1994
Roller coasters operated by Six Flags
The Great Escape and Hurricane Harbor
Wooden roller coasters
Roller coasters in New York (state)